Ovaro is a comune (municipality) in the Province of Udine in the Italian region Friuli-Venezia Giulia, located about  northwest of Trieste and about  northwest of Udine.

The municipality of Ovaro contains the frazioni (subdivisions, mainly villages and hamlets) Agrons, Cella, Chialina, Clavais, Cludinico, Entrampo, Lenzone, Liariis, Luincis, Luint, Mione, Muina, and Ovasta.

Ovaro borders the following municipalities: Ampezzo, Comeglians, Lauco, Prato Carnico, Ravascletto, Raveo, Sauris, Socchieve, Sutrio.

Demographic evolution

References

External links
 www.comune.ovaro.ud.it/

Cities and towns in Friuli-Venezia Giulia